The 2019 Michigan Wolverines football team represented the University of Michigan in the sport of college football during the 2019 NCAA Division I FBS football season. The Wolverines competed in the East Division of the Big Ten Conference and played their home games at Michigan Stadium in Ann Arbor, Michigan. Michigan was coached by Jim Harbaugh, who was in his fifth season.

Coming off a Peach Bowl appearance in 2018, Michigan began the year as slight favorites to win the Big Ten Conference, and were ranked seventh in the preseason AP Poll. Under the leadership of new offensive coordinator Josh Gattis, the Wolverine offense struggled in the early part of the season. In the second game of the year, Michigan escaped with an overtime win against Army. Two weeks later, the team was soundly defeated by Wisconsin, 35–14. Analysts saw as a turning point for the offense its second half performance against then-No. 7 Penn State, but Michigan's comeback attempt failed as it lost 28–21. The team defeated rivals Notre Dame and Michigan State in blowouts at home, but ended the regular season with a loss to Ohio State, its eighth straight loss in the series. Michigan was invited to the Citrus Bowl to play Alabama, where it lost 35–16 to end the year at 9–4, 6–3 in Big Ten play.

The offense was led by senior quarterback Shea Patterson, who became just the third Wolverine passer to ever eclipse the 3,000 yards passing mark. Offensive linemen Ben Bredeson and Jon Runyan Jr. were both named first-team all-conference. The defense was led by first-team all-conference cornerback Lavert Hill, as well as second-team selections Kwity Paye and Josh Uche on the defensive line, and linebacker Khaleke Hudson.

Preseason

Coaching changes
Michigan defensive line coach Greg Mattison and linebackers coach Al Washington both left to take jobs at Ohio State in early January 2019. Michigan announced the hiring of Josh Gattis as offensive coordinator on January 10. He previously was the wide receivers coach and co-offensive coordinator at Alabama for one season.  Head coach Jim Harbaugh also announced the hiring of former Boston College co-defensive coordinator Anthony Campanile as a defensive assistant and former Arizona State assistant Shaun Nua to be the new defensive line coach. Assistant head coach and passing game coordinator Pep Hamilton left the team in February. He had been one of the nation's highest paid assistants in 2018.

Player news

The team released a statement in February 2019 that running back Chris Evans, who was set to be the Wolverines' leading returning rusher, was no longer with the program. Evans announced on Twitter that he had "academic issues" and planned to continue his career at Michigan. In June, Coach Harbaugh confirmed that Evans would be suspended for the 2019 season.

Recruiting

Michigan's 2019 recruiting class consisted of 26 signees, including eight that enrolled early. The class was ranked as the nation's 8th best by 247Sports and ESPN, and 10th by Rivals. It was the highest ranked class in the Big Ten Conference by all three recruiting services.

Preseason Big Ten poll
Although the Big Ten Conference has not held an official preseason poll since 2010, Cleveland.com has polled sports journalists representing all member schools as a de facto preseason media poll since 2011. For the 2019 poll, Michigan was voted as the favorite to win both the East Division and the Big Ten Championship Game.

Schedule

Rankings

Radio
Radio coverage for all games will be broadcast statewide on The Michigan IMG Sports Network and on Sirius XM Satellite Radio. The radio announcers are Jim Brandstatter with play-by-play, Dan Dierdorf with color commentary, and Doug Karsch with sideline reports.

Game summaries

Middle Tennessee

Sources:

    
    
    
    
    
    
    
    
    

To open the season, Michigan hosted the Middle Tennessee Blue Raiders.

Michigan defeated Middle Tennessee 40–21. Middle Tennessee opened the scoring in the first quarter with an 18-yard touchdown run from Asher O'Hara, to take its first and only lead of the game. Michigan responded with a 34-yard field goal by Jake Moody, and a 36-yard touchdown pass from Shea Patterson to Tarik Black to take the lead. Michigan scored 17 points in the second quarter on a 28-yard touchdown pass from Patterson to Nico Collins, a 28-yard touchdown pass from Patterson to Sean McKeon, and a 27-yard field goal by Moody. Middle Tennessee responded with a two-yard touchdown pass from O'Hara to Jarrin Pierce, which made the score 27–14 in favor of Michigan at half-time. Michigan extended its lead in the third quarter on a six-yard touchdown run from Dylan McCaffrey. The teams exchanged touchdowns in the fourth quarter on a one-yard touchdown run from Ben VanSumeren for Michigan, and a 59-yard touchdown pass from O'Hara to Jimmy Marshall for Middle Tennessee.

Freshman running back Zach Charbonnet became the first Wolverine true freshman to start at tailback in a season opener since Sam McGuffie in 2008, and just the fourth player to do since 1944.

Army

Sources:

    
    
    
    
    
    

Following its opening game against Middle Tennessee, Michigan hosted the Army Black Knights. This was the first meeting between the schools since 1962. Michigan won the previous meeting 17–7.

Michigan defeated Army 24–21 in double overtime. Army opened the scoring in the first quarter with a one-yard touchdown run from Sandon McCoy. Michigan responded with a two-yard touchdown run from Zach Charbonnet. Army regained the lead in the second quarter on a one-yard touchdown run from Kelvin Hopkins Jr., which made the score 14–7 in favor of Army at half-time. Early in the second half, Army found itself in the red zone with an opportunity to take a two-score lead, however Hopkins threw an interception to Lavert Hill. Michigan responded with a one-yard touchdown run from Charbonnet to tie the game with 2:24 remaining in the third quarter. The game was scoreless for the remainder of regulation, and freshman Army kicker Cole Talley missed the would-be game-winning 50-yard field goal as time expired, after which the game went to overtime. In overtime, Army scored on a six-yard touchdown run from Hopkins. Michigan responded with a three-yard touchdown run from Charbonnet to force double overtime. In double overtime, Michigan scored on a 43-yard field goal by Moody. On Army's ensuing possession, Hopkins was sacked by Kwity Paye and Aidan Hutchinson, and the ball was fumbled and recovered by Josh Uche to seal the victory for the Wolverines.

Freshman running back Charbonnet had his first 100-yard rushing game, and posted three touchdowns. Michigan's defense held Army to just two pass completions on five attempts. It was the fewest completions by a Wolverine opponent since Rutgers also posted two pass completions in 2016.

at Wisconsin

Sources:

    
    
    
    
    
    

After playing Army and having a bye week, Michigan traveled to Madison to face the Wisconsin Badgers in its Big Ten Conference opener. Last season, Michigan defeated Wisconsin 38–13.

Michigan lost to Wisconsin 35–14. Wisconsin scored 14 points in the first quarter on two touchdown runs from Jonathan Taylor, from one-yard and 72-yards, respectively. Wisconsin added 14 points in the second quarter on two touchdown runs from Jack Coan, from 25-yards and two-yards, respectively, which made the score 28–0 in favor of Wisconsin at half-time. Wisconsin extended its lead in the third quarter on a two-yard touchdown run from Coan. Michigan finally got on the board late in the third quarter with a six-yard touchdown pass from Shea Patterson to Sean McKeon, and a two-point conversion pass from Patterson to Tarik Black, to avoid a shutout. Michigan scored the only points of the fourth quarter on a five-yard touchdown pass from Patterson to Donovan Peoples-Jones.

Rutgers

Sources:

    
    
    
    
    
    
    

Following its game against Wisconsin, Michigan hosted the Rutgers Scarlet Knights. Last season, Michigan won in a blowout, 42–7.

Michigan defeated Rutgers in a blowout 52–0. Michigan scored 14 points in the first quarter on a 48-yard touchdown pass from Shea Patterson to Nico Collins, and a two-yard touchdown run from Patterson. Michigan added 10 points in the second quarter on a four-yard touchdown run from Patterson and a 33-yard field goal by Jake Moody, which made the score 24–0 in favor of Michigan at half-time. Michigan added 14 points in the third quarter on a seven-yard touchdown run from Christian Turner and a one-yard touchdown run from Patterson. Michigan added 14 more points in the fourth quarter on a one-yard touchdown run from Joe Milton and a 23-yard touchdown pass from Milton to Giles Jackson.

This was Michigan's first shutout victory since defeating Rutgers 78–0 in 2016. Patterson became the sixth quarterback in program history to rush for three touchdowns in a game, and the first to do so since Devin Gardner in 2013. Michigan's defense held Rutgers to 152 yards of total offense and just 2.9 yards per play. The last time Michigan held an opponent under 200 yards was Penn State (186) last season. Dan Jokisch, Alan Selzer and German Green all made their Michigan debuts during the game.

Iowa
 

Sources:

    
    

After facing Rutgers, Michigan hosted the Iowa Hawkeyes in its homecoming game. This was the first meeting between the two teams since 2016. In the previous meeting, Iowa upset Michigan, 13–14.

Michigan defeated Iowa 10–3. Michigan scored ten points in the first quarter on a 28-yard field goal by Jake Moody and a two-yard touchdown run from Zach Charbonnet. In the second quarter, Iowa responded with a 22-yard field goal by Keith Duncan, which made the score 10–3 in favor of Michigan at half-time. Both teams were held scoreless during the second half of the game.

Michigan's defense forced four turnovers, including three interceptions and one fumble and held Iowa to one rushing yard, the Hawkeyes averaged 217.5 rushing yards per game entering the game. The Wolverine's posted a season-high eight sacks, the first time they recorded at least five sacks in a game since 2017 against Purdue. This was Michigan's third game this season with multiple turnovers forced.

at Illinois

Sources:

    
    
    
    
    
    
    
    
    

After its homecoming game against Iowa, Michigan traveled to Champaign, Illinois to face the Illinois Fighting Illini. This was the first meeting between the two teams since 2016. Michigan won the previous meeting, 41–8.

Michigan defeated Illinois 42–25. Michigan scored 14 points in the first quarter on a 29-yard touchdown run from Hassan Haskins and a 25-yard touchdown pass from Shea Patterson to Luke Schoonmaker. Michigan added 14 points in the second quarter on a seven-yard touchdown run from Zach Charbonnet and a four-yard touchdown pass from Patterson to Nick Eubanks. Illinois finally got on the board late in the first half on a 23-yard touchdown pass from Matt Robinson to Josh Imatorbhebhe, which made the score 28–7 in favor of Michigan at half-time. Illinois scored the only points of the third quarter on a 50-yard field goal by James McCourt and a one-yard touchdown run from Matt Robinson. Illinois opened the scoring in the fourth quarter on a one-yard touchdown run from Dre Brown, and a two-point conversion run from Brown, reducing Michigan's lead to three points. Michigan responded with 14 points on a five-yard touchdown pass from Patterson to Donovan Peoples-Jones and a one-yard touchdown run from Patterson.

Michigan recorded 162 rushing yards in the first quarter, the most by the Wolverines against a Big Ten opponent in the first quarter in 15 seasons. Michigan finished the game with a season-high 295 rushing yards. Freshman running back Zach Charbonnet had 108 rushing yards in the first half, becoming the first Wolverine to do so since Karan Higdon ran for 139 against Nebraska last season.

at Penn State

Sources:

    
    
    
    
    
    

Following its game against Illinois, Michigan traveled to Happy Valley to face the Penn State Nittany Lions. Last season, Michigan won in a blowout, 42–7.

Michigan lost to Penn State 21–28 in Penn State's annual White Out game. Penn State opened the scoring in the first quarter on a 17-yard touchdown pass from Sean Clifford to Pat Freiermuth. Penn State added 14 points in the second quarter on a two-yard touchdown run from Clifford and a 25-yard touchdown pass from Clifford to K. J. Hamler. Michigan finally got on the board late in the first half on a 12-yard touchdown run from Zach Charbonnet. Michigan kicker Jake Moody missed a 52-yard field goal attempt in the final minute of the half, which made the score 21–7 in favor of Penn State at half-time. Michigan scored the only points of the third quarter on a 12-yard touchdown run from Charbonnet. The teams exchanged touchdowns in the fourth quarter on a 53-yard touchdown pass from Clifford to Hamler for Penn State and a one-yard touchdown run from Shea Patterson for Michigan with 8:48 remaining. Down by seven points, Michigan forced a Penn State three-and-out and regained possession with 6:46 to go. Michigan drove the length of the field and advanced to the Penn State three yard line. On fourth and goal, Patterson's pass to Ronnie Bell was dropped by Bell in the endzone. Penn State then wound down the final 2:01 to win the game.

Notre Dame

Sources:

    
    
    
    
    
    
    
    

After its game against Penn State, Michigan hosted the Notre Dame Fighting Irish to rekindle its long-running rivalry. Last season, Michigan lost to Notre Dame in a season-opening match-up, 24–17.

Michigan defeated Notre Dame 45–14 in a game played in driving rain. On Michigan's first offensive possession, it was held to a three-and-out, but on the ensuing punt, the ball was fumbled by the Notre Dame return man and recovered by Michigan's Daxton Hill. Michigan stalled at the goal line and settled for a 21-yard field goal by Jake Moody. Michigan's next possession carried over into the second quarter and ended with a seven-yard touchdown run from Zach Charbonnet. Michigan forced another Notre Dame punt, and scored another touchdown on its next drive, this one from one yard out by Charbonnet. The score was 17–0 in favor of Michigan at half-time. Notre Dame finally got on the board in the third quarter on a seven-yard touchdown pass from Ian Book to Cole Kmet. Michigan responded with an eight-yard touchdown pass from Shea Patterson to Donovan Peoples-Jones. Michigan added 21 points in the fourth quarter on a 16-yard touchdown pass from Patterson to Nico Collins, a 27-yard touchdown run from Tru Wilson and a 26-yard touchdown pass from Dylan McCaffrey to Mike Sainristil. Down 45–7, Notre Dame scored on a 14-yard touchdown pass from Phil Jurkovec to Javon McKinley with 3:45 remaining, and Michigan wound down the rest of the clock on its next possession.

Michigan's 31-point victory marked its third-largest margin of victory against Notre Dame in series history. Michigan's defense held Notre Dame to 47 yards rushing on 31 carries, and 180 yards of total offense.

at Maryland

Sources:

    
    
    
    
    
    

After facing Notre Dame, Michigan traveled to College Park to face the Maryland Terrapins. Last season, following a 70-minute weather delay due to thunderstorms in the area, Michigan defeated Maryland 42–21.

Michigan defeated Maryland 38–7. Michigan scored 14 points in the first quarter on a game-opening 97-yard kickoff return by Giles Jackson and a two-yard touchdown run from Zach Charbonnet on Michigan's first offensive possession. Michigan extended its lead in the second quarter on an eight-yard touchdown run from Charbonnet. Michigan's Jake Moody missed a 37-yard field goal attempt in the final seconds of the half, and the score was 21–0 Michigan at half-time. Michigan added 14 points in the third quarter on a five-yard touchdown pass from Shea Patterson to Nick Eubanks, and a 14-yard touchdown run from Hassan Haskins. Maryland finally got on the board late in the third quarter on a 97-yard kickoff return by Javon Leake. In the fourth quarter Michigan scored on a 38-yard field goal by Quinn Nordin.

With two touchdowns in the game, running back Zach Charbonnet set a Michigan program record for the most touchdowns by a freshman with 11.

Michigan State

Sources:

    
    
    
    
    
    
    
    
    

After its game against Maryland and having a second bye week, Michigan hosted its in-state rival, the Michigan State Spartans in the battle for the Paul Bunyan Trophy. Last season, Michigan defeated Michigan State 21–7.

Michigan defeated Michigan State 44–10. Michigan State opened the scoring in the first quarter with a one-yard touchdown pass from Brian Lewerke to Max Rosenthal. Michigan punted on its first two possessions, but scored on each of its next eight. Michigan's first points came on the second play of the second quarter on a one-yard touchdown run from Hassan Haskins. Its next drive began on its two-yard line, and ended 12 plays and 98 yards later with a five-yard touchdown pass from Shea Patterson to Nick Eubanks. Michigan kicker Quinn Nordin converted a 28-yard field goal with 15 seconds left in the half, which made the score 17–7 in favor of Michigan at half-time. Michigan added 10 points in the third quarter on an 18-yard touchdown pass from Patterson to Donovan Peoples-Jones and a 49-yard field goal by Nordin. Michigan State scored on a 35-yard field goal by Matt Coghlin. Michigan added 17 points in the fourth quarter on a 22-yard touchdown pass from Patterson to Nico Collins, a 33-yard field goal by Nordin and a 39-yard touchdown pass from Patterson to Cornelius Johnson.

Michigan's defense held Michigan State to 54 rushing yards and only 17 receptions, the Spartans' second lowest reception total of the season. Patterson's 384 yards and four touchdown passes represented career highs for him since transferring to Michigan. Tom Fornelli of CBS Sports called the game "a thoroughly dominating performance by the Wolverines", noting that Michigan's 44 points "are the most it has scored in a game against Michigan State since a 45–37 victory in 2004". According to MLive, the game was the most lopsided loss Mark Dantonio experienced in his 13 rivalry games, and it was also the largest margin of defeat for Michigan State against Michigan since a 49–3 loss in 2002.

at Indiana

Sources:

    
    
    
    
    
    
    

Following its game against in-state rival Michigan State, Michigan traveled to play its final road game against the Indiana Hoosiers. Last season, Michigan defeated Indiana 31–20.

Michigan defeated Indiana 39–14. The teams exchanged touchdowns in the first quarter on a one-yard touchdown run from Stevie Scott III for Indiana, and a six-yard touchdown pass from Shea Patterson to Ronnie Bell for Michigan. Indiana regained the lead in the second quarter on a one-yard touchdown run from Peyton Ramsey. Michigan responded with 32 unanswered points. Michigan scored 14 points in the second quarter on an 11-yard touchdown pass from Patterson to Donovan Peoples-Jones and a 24-yard touchdown pass from Patterson to Nico Collins, which made the score 21–14 in favor of Michigan at half-time. Michigan scored 18 points in the third quarter on a 27-yard field goal by Quinn Nordin, and two touchdown passes from Patterson to Collins, from 76-yards, and 19-yards, respectively. Both teams were held scoreless in the fourth quarter.

Quarterback Shea Patterson finished the game 20-of-32 passing for 366 yards with five touchdowns, becoming the first Michigan quarterback with consecutive 300-yard games since Jake Rudock in 2015. He also became the first quarterback in program history to record four touchdown passes in consecutive games. Patterson's five touchdown passes were the second most by any quarterback in program history and the most during a regulation game.

Ohio State

Sources:

    
    
    
    
    
    
    
    
    
    
    
    

Following its road finale against Indiana, Michigan hosted Ohio State, in the 116th playing of "The Game". Last season, Michigan was upset by Ohio State 62–39.

Michigan lost to Ohio State 56–27. Michigan opened the scoring in the first quarter on a 22-yard touchdown run from Giles Jackson, after which Quinn Nordin's extra point missed. Ohio State scored 14 points on a five-yard touchdown run from J. K. Dobbins and a 57-yard touchdown pass from Justin Fields to Chris Olave. Michigan responded with a 25-yard touchdown pass from Shea Patterson to Donovan Peoples-Jones, reducing the Buckeyes' lead to one. Ohio State added 14 points in the second quarter on two touchdown runs from Dobbins, from six-yards, and five-yards, respectively. Michigan scored on a 23-yard field goal by Nordin, which made the score 28–16 in favor of Ohio State at half-time. Ohio State added 14 more points in the third quarter on two touchdown passes from Fields, a six-yard touchdown pass to K. J. Hill and a 30-yard touchdown pass to Garrett Wilson. Michigan scored on a 45-yard field goal by Nordin. In the fourth quarter, Michigan scored on a two-yard touchdown run from Hassan Haskins, followed by a two-point conversion run from Haskins. Ohio State again added 14 points on a 16-yard touchdown pass from Fields to Austin Mack, and a 33-yard touchdown run from Dobbins.

Ohio State extended its winning streak in the series to eight games, which became the longest streak by either team in series history. The Buckeyes also became the first team in the series to score 50 or more points in consecutive games. Michigan quarterback Shea Patterson completed 14 of 18 passes in the first half, but was 4 of 24 in the second half, which was the lowest completion percentage for an FBS quarterback in one half (attempting at least 20 passes) in at least 15 years. He threw for 305 yards and one touchdown, becoming the first quarterback in program history to throw for 300 or more yards in three consecutive games. With Giles Jackson's rushing touchdown in the first quarter, he became the second true freshmen in program history to score touchdowns via kick return, receiving and rushing in his first season, following Gil Chapman in 1972.

vs. Alabama (Citrus Bowl)

 Sources:

    
    
    
    
    
    
    
    

On December 8, Michigan was selected to play in the Citrus Bowl against the Alabama Crimson Tide. Michigan lost the most recent meeting between the teams 41–14 in the 2012 Cowboys Classic. This was Michigan's 48th bowl game appearance, and its sixth appearance in the Citrus Bowl.

Michigan lost to Alabama 35–16. Alabama opened the scoring in the first quarter on an 85-yard touchdown pass from Mac Jones to Jerry Jeudy. Michigan responded with ten points on a seven-yard touchdown pass from Shea Patterson to Nick Eubanks, and a 36-yard field goal by Quinn Nordin to take its first lead of the game. Michigan extended its lead in the second quarter on a 42-yard field goal by Nordin. Alabama responded with a nine-yard touchdown run from Najee Harris to regain the lead. Quinn Nordin then kicked a Citrus Bowl record 57-yard field goal as time expired in the first half, which made the score 16–14 in favor of Michigan at half-time. Michigan was held scoreless in the second half, as Alabama scored 21 unanswered points. Alabama scored the only points in the third quarter on a 42-yard touchdown pass from Jones to DeVonta Smith to regain the lead. Alabama scored 14 points in the fourth quarter on a 20-yard touchdown pass from Jones to Miller Forristall and a two-yard touchdown run from Harris.

Quarterback Shea Patterson finished the season with 3,061 passing yards, becoming the third quarterback in program history to pass for over 3,000 yards in a season, following John Navarre (3,331 yards in 2003) and Jake Rudock (3,017 yards in 2015). Quinn Nordin converted a 57-yard field goal at the end of the first half, the longest field goal in Citrus Bowl history, and tying the record for the longest field goal made in Michigan program history.

Roster

Awards and honors

2020 NFL Draft

The 2020 NFL Draft was held remotely (due to the COVID-19 pandemic) from April 23–25. Michigan tied a program record, and had the second most selections in the draft, with 10 players chosen. Three additional Michigan players were signed to NFL teams as undrafted free agents.

References

External links

Michigan
Michigan Wolverines football seasons
Michigan Wolverines football